Medical study could refer to:
 The study of medicine
 A clinical trial